The KTX-Sancheon (formerly called the KTX-II) is a South Korean high-speed train built by Hyundai Rotem in the second half of the 2000s and operated by Korail since March 2009.

History

When South Korea started its high-speed rail project, rolling stock and infrastructure was built in the framework of a technology transfer agreement between GEC-Alsthom (today Alstom), the main maker of French TGV high-speed trains, and South Korean companies. Thus Korea Train Express (KTX) began operating with KTX-I trains, which were derived from the TGV Réseau, and built both by Alstom and Rotem. The technology transfer agreement did not provide for a complete control of manufacturing processes, and construction involved the import of parts. To increase the domestic added value, in 1996, an alliance of South Korean government research agencies, universities, and private companies started a project called G7 to develop domestic high-speed rail technology.

The main element of the G7 project was the 7-car experimental high-speed train HSR-350x, originally intended as the prototype of a train with 20-car and 11-car versions for  commercial service.

Possible configurations would have been 12-car, 10-car, and 8-car versions with two traction heads and 8-car, 6-car versions with one traction head and a driving trailer. The versions with two traction heads would have offered 500, 384 and 268 seats respectively. The active passenger compartment pressure control system of the HSR-350x wasn't deemed necessary for the proposed Honam high-speed train, only pressure isolation as in the KTX-I.

The view that shorter trains have to be added to the KTX rolling stock for operational flexibility was reinforced by the actual Honam KTX seat occupation trends after the launch of KTX services on April 1, 2004, with the 20-car KTX-I trains. In October 2005, however, Korail called competitive bids. Rotem, offering a commercial version of the HSR-350x, was chosen over Alstom as preferred bidder for the ₩300 billion order in December 2005. The order for 10 trains for a price equal to $306 million was placed on June 6, 2006. Six of the trainsets were intended for the Honam KTX service from June 2009, four for the Jeolla KTX service from June 2010. A second batch of nine sets was ordered in December 2007, intended for Gyeongjeon KTX services between Seoul and Masan, to be delivered by December 2010. A third batch of five sets was ordered on December 9, 2008; for delivery by December 2011, intended to strengthen Gyeongbu KTX services.

A mock-up showing the exterior and interior design of two passenger cars was shown at exhibitions in 2007, with one of the mock-up cars built as a driving trailer to also display the nose design of the traction heads of the actual train. On November 25, 2008, the first KTX-II set was revealed to the public in a roll-out ceremony at the Hyundai Rotem factory in Changwon.

Hyundai Rotem also offered the KTX-II in the competition to supply rolling stock for Brazil's Rio–São Paulo project.

Technical details
Like the HSR-350x, the KTX-II consists of two traction heads, that is the power cars at both ends, and an articulated set of trailers for passengers in-between; but the number of intermediate cars is eight, and no intermediate car is powered. Two sets can be coupled together with automatic couplers of the Scharfenberg type. The couplers and the surrounding structure form an integral unit, the so-called front ends, which were supplied by German industrial company Voith.  The vehicles received a new exterior front shape, designed by French design studio MBD Design.  The aerodynamic shape was inspired by the cherry salmon, an indigenous fish.

Like for the HSR-350x, the carbody of intermediate cars is made of aluminum. Unlike the HSR-350x, the vehicle lacks bogie shrouding.

The KTX-II's traction motors, converters, traction control and braking system are domestic developments resulting from the HSR-350x programme. The traction motors are asynchronous induction motors like those of the HSR-350x, rather than synchronous motors as on the KTX-I.  Final drive gearboxes were supplied by Voith. The power electronics in the converters use newly available IGBTs, supplied by American semiconductor manufacturer IXYS Corporation, rather than the originally foreseen but unreliable IGCTs of the HSR-350x. Each traction converter consists of two parallel-switched four-quadrant converters, which function as rectifier modules by converting single-phase alternating current (AC) from one main transformer winding each to direct current (DC), a 2,800 V DC intermediate circuit, and one inverter module converting the DC supply to the three-phase AC supply for traction motors. Each converter supplies the motors on two axles of a bogie, providing for individual bogie control. All auxiliary power is supplied by separate 1 MW auxiliary units, one per traction head, consisting of two pairs of parallel-switched IGBT-based converter modules acting as rectifiers between one main transformer winding and the 670 V DC head end power. The VVVF inverters for the motor and converter cooling fans and the air compressor, the constant voltage constant frequency (CVCF) inverters for the cab air-conditioning, the battery charge, the on-board AC supply and the oil pumps are connected to the head end power within the auxiliary unit.

The third intermediate car offers elevated comfort First Class seating, the others Standard Class. The fourth passenger car houses a snack bar and family compartments with separated facing seats. Other passenger comfort features include wireless internet access and digital multimedia broadcasts, and business compartments with small tables. Like on the KTX-I, all passenger compartments are equipped with ceiling-mounted video displays, but 19" LCD screens are used instead of 17" ones. Unlike those of the KTX-I, the KTX-II passenger compartments were fitted with fire detectors. Toilet doors were automatised, and the toilet in the first passenger car is suited for disabled persons.

In addition to Automatic Train Control (ATC) for high-speed lines and traditional Automatic train stop (ATS) for conventional lines, the trains were among the first to be equipped with the new domestically developed ATP automatic train protection system.  The ERTMS-compatible system is meant as an improvement over ATS on conventional lines, and makes shorter braking distances possible by allowing braking from full speed to stop in one step.

Domestic added value was increased from 58% for the KTX-I to 87%.  According to the Korea Railroad Research Institute, the purchase of KTX-II trains was calculated to save 840 billion won compared to a forecast spending of 7,500 billion won until 2020 if high-speed trains had been imported.

Operation
Following testing, the KTX-II carried its first passengers in a preview run on February 11, 2010.  After a naming competition held in the next ten days, the KTX-II was officially renamed as KTX-Sancheon (KTX ). Sancheon comes from sancheoneo, the Korean word for cherry salmon (Oncorhynchus masou masou).

Commercial KTX-Sancheon service started on March 2, 2010. In contrast to the original plans, the first trains are used both in Honam and Gyeongbu KTX service.  Korail started to operate its first pair of non-stop services on the Seoul–Busan relation on December 1, 2010, using KTX-Sancheon trains.  Gyeongjeon KTX service to Masan started on December 15, 2010.

Until December 2010, KTX-Sancheon trains broke down 15 times, with most incidents related to the signal device. Domestic observers expressed fear that the news of the breakdowns will negatively impact Rotem's chances in the competition to supply the Rio–São Paulo project or the US state of California's CHSR project, while Korail argued that the publication of start-up glitches is a result of its policy to make all information public, contrasting it with Chinese makers.

Only one passenger suffered slight injury. Preliminary investigation found no problems with the train, but indicated that the accident was caused by human errors by maintenance workers. At the time, three cars of the train were reserved for the President of South Korea, Lee Myung-bak's, entourage, but he was not on board at the time of the accident.

Classes 120000 train sets are currently on loan to SR for SRT service between Suseo and Busan/Mokpo.

See also

 List of high speed trains
 HEMU-430X
 Rail transport in South Korea
 Tilting Train Express
 Mugunghwa-ho

References

External links

High-speed trains of South Korea
High-speed trains
Korea Train Express
Hyundai Rotem multiple units
Electric multiple units with locomotive-like power cars
25 kV AC multiple units